Nathan Bartholomay (born May 18, 1989) is an American pair skater. With his former partner Deanna Stellato-Dudek, he is the 2018 Ondrej Nepela Trophy silver medalist, the 2018 Nebelhorn Trophy bronze medalist, and a two-time U.S. national bronze medalist (2018 and 2019).

With former partner Felicia Zhang, he is a two-time U.S. national medalist (silver in 2014, bronze in 2013) and competed at the 2014 Winter Olympics.

He is currently paired with Katie McBeath.

Personal life 
Bartholomay was born May 18, 1989, in Newtown, Pennsylvania. In 2010, he graduated from Laurel Springs High School.

Career

Early years 
Bartholomay began skating in 1997. He first tried pairs around 2003. Early in his career, he skated with Erica Choi Smith and Meg Byrne.

Partnership with Zhang 
Bartholomay teamed up with Felicia Zhang in May 2011. They were coached by Jim Peterson and Lyndon Johnston at the Ice and Sports Complex in Ellenton, Florida. In their first season, they placed eighth at the U.S. Championships.

Zhang/Bartholomay won bronze at the 2013 U.S. Championships and were assigned to the 2013 Four Continents Championships, where they placed fourth.

In the 2013–14 season, Zhang/Bartholomay received two Grand Prix assignments; they finished seventh at the 2013 Skate America and sixth at the 2013 Cup of China. After winning the silver medal at the 2014 U.S. Championships, ahead of Caydee Denney / John Coughlin, they were named to the U.S. team for the Olympics and listed as first alternates for the World Championships. Zhang/Bartholomay finished 12th at the 2014 Winter Olympics in Sochi. They were called up to replace the injured Denney/Coughlin at the 2014 World Championships, where they finished 14th. They announced the end of their partnership on July 16, 2014.

Partnership with Donlan 
In July 2014, Bartholomay teamed up with Gretchen Donlan. In late October, he underwent surgery to repair a disc and remove bone spurs in his ankle, causing the pair to withdraw from their first assignment, the 2014 CS Ice Challenge. They placed seventh at the 2015 U.S. Championships and concluded their first season with gold at the International Challenge Cup.

In the 2015–16 season, Donlan/Bartholomay appeared at two Challenger Series events, placing fifth at the 2015 U.S. Classic and sixth at the Ondrej Nepela Trophy. They withdrew from their Grand Prix assignment, the 2015 Skate America, after Donlan fell ill with a severe flu. She developed labyrinthitis in her right ear, resulting in vertigo that kept her off the ice for three months and forced the pair to withdraw from the 2016 U.S. Championships. The pair announced the end of their partnership in March 2016. They were coached by Jim Peterson in Ellenton, Florida.

Partnership with Stellato-Dudek 
After unsuccessful tryouts with other skaters, Bartholomay was considering a coaching career. U.S. Figure Skating's high-performance director, Mitch Moyer, suggested a tryout with Deanna Stellato, a former single skater who was visiting the rink at which Bartholomay was working. In July 2016, Stellato and Bartholomay announced that they had formed a partnership and were based at the Ellenton Ice and Sports Complex. Coached by Jim Peterson, they train on ice three hours a day, five days a week.

Making their international debut together, the pair placed 6th at the 2016 CS Golden Spin of Zagreb. After taking the gold medal at the Eastern Sectional Championships, they qualified for the 2017 U.S. Championships. The pair placed third at the 2018 U.S. Championships.  They placed fifth at the 2018 Four Continents Championships.

Stellato-Dudek/Bartholomay opened the 2018–19 figure skating season with two Challenger events, winning silver at the Nepela Trophy and bronze at Nebelhorn Trophy.  They placed sixth at the 2018 Grand Prix of Helsinki and had to withdraw from the 2018 Rostelecom Cup.  Competing in a third Challenger event, they won another bronze medal at the 2018 CS Golden Spin of Zagreb.  Stellato-Dudek/Bartholomay won a second consecutive bronze medal at the 2019 U.S. Championships.  However, due to perceived inconsistent results earlier in the season, they were not assigned to the third American berth at the 2019 Four Continents Championships, that going instead to pewter medalists Tarah Kayne / Danny O'Shea.  Stellato-Dudek and Bartholomay parted ways after the 2018-2019 figure skating season.

Partnership with McBeath 
At the end of May 2020, Bartholomay announced that he had teamed up with Katie McBeath and had started training in Irvine, California under Jenni Meno, Todd Sand, Christine Binder, and Chris Knierim.They made their debut as a pair as at the virtual ISP Points Challenge where they were seventh. They also placed seventh at their debut as a pair at the 2021 U.S. Championships.

McBeath/Bartholomay placed 7th in their international debut at the 2021 Cranberry and then debuted on the Challenger series at the 2021 CS Autumn Classic International, finishing 5th. They placed 5th at the 2022 U.S. Championships and then went on to finish 5th at the 2022 Four Continents.

Programs

With McBeath

With Stellato-Dudek

With Donlan

With Zhang

Competitive highlights 
GP: Grand Prix; CS: Challenger Series

With McBeath

With Stellato

With Donlan

With Zhang

With Smith

With Byrne

References

External links 
 
Deanna Stellato / Nathan Bartholomay at Ice Network

American male pair skaters
1989 births
Living people
Sportspeople from Pennsylvania
Figure skaters at the 2014 Winter Olympics
Olympic figure skaters of the United States
20th-century American people
21st-century American people